Carlos "Sonny" Dolorico Padilla Jr. (born April 19, 1934) is a retired actor and boxing referee and judge from the Philippines. He is best known for refereeing the "Thrilla in Manila" between Muhammad Ali and Joe Frazier in 1975.

Career
The son of an Olympic boxer and actor, Padilla's professional career began as an actor, where he was known a commercial advertisement of "Family Rubbing Alcohol" with the famous slogan, Hindi lang pampamilya, pang-isports pa. His acting career spanned over 40 years, with his final credited role in Sige, Subukan Mo in 1998.

Padilla first came to international prominence as a referee when he refereed the third fight between Muhammad Ali and Joe Frazier, known as the "Thrilla in Manila". Before the fight, Frazier's trainer Eddie Futch, who was concerned about potential officiating bias, objected to all three American referees who had traveled to the Philippines, so Padilla -- then a little-known local official -- was selected as a late replacement, finding out of his selection the day before the fight. Despite having 11 years of experience, it was Padilla's first time officiating a fight above the 135-lb. weight class. On his official scorecard for the fight (which Ali won by TKO after 14 rounds), Padilla scored in favor of Ali, 66-60.

Encouraged by Don King (who had previously objected to Padilla's inclusion in the fight), Padilla relocated to the United States afterwards, and went on to officiate many high-profile boxing matches through the next two-plus decades, including Sugar Ray Leonard vs. Wilfred Benítez, Mike Tyson vs. Pinklon Thomas, Sugar Ray Leonard vs. Roberto Durán 1, Thomas Hearns vs. Roberto Durán, Julio César Chávez vs. Ruben Castillo, Dwight Muhammad Qawi vs. Matthew Saad Muhammad and Salvador Sánchez vs. Wilfredo Gómez. He refereed his final bout on October 14, 2000, between Manny Pacquiao and Nedal Hussein in the Philippines, a fight in which he admitted to cheating in order to help Pacquiao win.

Personal life
Padilla is the son of actor and Olympic boxer Carlos Padilla Sr. He is also father to singer and actress Zsa Zsa Padilla and a grandfather to Karylle and Zia.

He was given a lifetime achievement award by the Philippine Sportswriters Association in 2011.

Filmography

References

External links
 
 

1934 births
Living people
Boxing referees
Filipino male film actors
Carlos Jr.